The Japanese Journal of Clinical Oncology is a monthly peer-reviewed medical journal covering clinical oncology. It was established in 1971 and is published by Oxford University Press. The editor-in-chief is Tadao Kakizoe. According to the Journal Citation Reports, the journal has a 2016 impact factor of 1.905.

References

External links

Oncology journals
Oxford University Press academic journals
Publications established in 1971
Monthly journals
English-language journals